Laurent Pimond (born 6 April 1965) is a French former professional footballer who played as a forward.

Career 
Pimond joined the Paris Saint-Germain Academy in 1982, after spending two and a half years in the academy of Sochaux. He made his first appearance for Paris Saint-Germain on 28 May 1985, in a 6–1 defeat to Nancy. PSG's only goal was scored by Pimond, a free-kick that ended up in the top corner of the goal.

On 27 September 1985, Pimond made his second and final appearance for PSG in a 4–1 win over Sochaux, after coming on as a substitute in the 77th minute of the match. For the second half of the 1985–86 season, he was loaned out to Red Star, as he did not get along with the PSG coach at the time, Gérard Houllier. Despite only playing only a portion of a match for PSG in the 1985–86 season, Pimond became a champion of the French division. "I only played 15 minutes during the 85/86 season, I don't really feel like a champion, even though I am officially, on paper," he said in an interview with PSG70.

Pimond ended his loan at Red Star at the end of the season and left PSG in the summer. He joined Versailles for six months, and finished the season with Créteil. He then spent three seasons at  before ending his career as a professional footballer at the age of 27.

After football 
While playing with amateur sides, Pimond worked as a sales manager for a press, television, and cinema publisher. After April 2006, he held the same position in Éditions But.

Career statistics

Honours 
Paris Saint-Germain
 Division 1: 1985–86

References

External links 

 

Living people
1965 births
Association football forwards
French footballers
FC Sochaux-Montbéliard players
Paris Saint-Germain F.C. players
Red Star F.C. players
FC Versailles 78 players
US Créteil-Lusitanos players
FC Balagne players
Ligue 1 players
Ligue 2 players
French Division 3 (1971–1993) players